The 1996 SEC Championship Game was won by the Florida Gators 45–30 over the Alabama Crimson Tide. The game was played in the Georgia Dome in Atlanta, Georgia, on December 7, 1996, and was televised to a national audience on ABC.

See also
 Alabama–Florida football rivalry

References

External links
Recap of the game from SECsports.com
Game review from RollTide.com

Championship Game
SEC Championship Game
Alabama Crimson Tide football games
Florida Gators football games
SEC Championship Game
SEC Championship Game
SEC Championship Game